To Record Only Water for Ten Days is the third studio album by American musician John Frusciante, released in 2001 through Warner Music Group. Unlike his previous two solo albums, Niandra Lades and Usually Just a T-Shirt and Smile from the Streets You Hold, the record differs significantly in that Frusciante explores elements of electronica, synthpop and new wave.

Background
Following a month in rehab for his heroin addiction and his rejoining the Red Hot Chili Peppers, Frusciante felt deeply connected to the spiritual plane and was inspired by the many visions he had of spirits; the ideology of recording water for ten days refers to ten separate periods of time in which an album is conceived. In an interview he explained that the title comes from a symbolic picture of his body being a tape recorder that records the water for ten days as a way to take his "chemical makeup" off, in order to make a possible representation of the feelings and places he wanted to represent through music. Frusciante was encouraged to record the album by producer Jimmy Boyle who had helped him overcome his addiction. The lyrics express this theme and deal mostly with philosophical and spiritual matters as well as delving into his usual brand of psychedelia-tinged personalism.

Frusciante's main influences for this album were 1980s synthpop, post-punk and electronica bands that did their own programming, including bands such as Depeche Mode and New Order.

Recording and release
Frusciante recorded the album after kicking his addiction to heroin. As with his first two albums, Niandra Lades and Usually Just a T-Shirt and Smile from the Streets You Hold, Frusciante recorded this album at home. But while he had taken a conspicuously lo-fi approach on the earlier albums, using a 4-track cassette recorder and even a boombox, he produced To Record Only Water for Ten Days in much higher fidelity. Frusciante switched to a Yamaha MD8 – a digital 8-track recorder that used Minidisc technology – to record the raw tracks, which he later transferred to analog tape for further individual track equalization. All guitars were recorded direct-in without amplification.

Contrary to the title of the album, it took longer than ten days to record: according to Frusciante, he spent up to three days on each song.

Frusciante admitted his frustration with digital recording during the making of the album and has since felt inclined towards recording his albums with analog equipment. "When we came to mix that record, I realized how bad it sounded. After that album, I vowed that I wasn't going to record anything on digital anymore."

WMG released the album on February 13, 2001. It charted at #30 on Heatseekers. Vincent Gallo directed a video for every track on the record.

"Murderers" is featured in the "Invisible Boards" segment of the skateboarding home video Yeah Right!. The track "Remain" features on episode 18 of the hit Fox series 24.

In 2017, the Australian label Twelve Suns rereleased the album on vinyl in a limited edition of 1500 copies.

Track listing

Non-album tracks
Dozens of songs were recorded for the album but left off. The following have been released in some form. Many of these tracks have been released on Frusciante's first internet album, From The Sounds Inside.

Personnel
John Frusciante – vocals, electric guitar, acoustic guitar, synthesizer, drum machine, producer
Lawrence Azerrad – design, art assistant
Jimmy Boyle – mixing and production
Vladimir Meller – mastering

References

External links

John Frusciante albums
Warner Records albums
2001 albums